Behn's bat, Behn's big-eared bat, or Behn's graybeard bat (Glyphonycteris behnii) is a species of bat in the family Phyllostomidae found in Brazil and Peru. It is known only from six specimens and is considered rare. It feeds on insects and small fruits.

Taxonomy and etymology
Behn's bat was described in 1865 by German naturalist Wilhelm Peters. Peters placed it in the now-defunct genus Schizostoma with a scientific name of Schizostoma behnii. The holotype was collected in Cuiabá, Brazil. In 1898, Gerrit Smith Miller Jr. reclassified it, placing it in the genus Micronycteris. In 1906, Knud Andersen placed it in Glyphonycteris but spelled the species name as behni. The eponym for the species name "behnii" is German zoologist Wilhelm Friedrich Georg Behn.

Description
The lancet of its nose-leaf is about 1.5 times longer than it is wide.

Biology and ecology
Based on the diets of closely related species, Behn's bat is likely omnivorous, consuming insects and small fruits.

Range and habitat
Behn's bat is native to South America, where it is found in Brazil and Peru. In Brazil, it is found in the Cerrado.

Conservation
As of 2016, it is evaluated as a data deficient species by the IUCN because only six individuals have ever been documented. Little is known about its population size, ecology, or potential threats. However, it is potentially threatened by habitat loss due to conversion to farmland.

References

Glyphonycteris
Mammals described in 1865
Taxonomy articles created by Polbot
Taxa named by Wilhelm Peters
Bats of South America